Lough Mask is a limestone lake of about  in Counties Mayo and Galway, Ireland, north of Lough Corrib. Lough Mask is the middle of the three lakes, which empty into the Corrib River, through Galway, into Galway Bay. Lough Carra flows into Lough Mask, which feeds into Lough Corrib through an underground stream which becomes the River Cong.

Lough Mask is the fourth largest lake, by area, in Ireland and the sixth largest lake in the island of Ireland. The eastern half of Lough Mask is shallow and contains many islands. The other half (Upper Lough Mask) is much deeper, sinking to a long trench with depths in excess of 50 metres.

History
In 1338 Sir Edmond de Burgh was drowned in the lake by his cousin Sir Edmond Albanach Bourke of County Mayo, at the end of the Burke Civil War (1333–1338). He was captured at Ballinrobe and taken to Oilean-an-lara (the Earls Island) where he was killed.

According to a side-note on the manuscript containing the oldest copy of 'Tóruigheacht Dhiarmada agus Ghráinne' ("The Pursuit of Diarmuid and Gráinne") (Royal Irish Academy Ms. 24.P.9), Irish scribe Dáibhídh Bacach ("lame David") Ó Duibhgeannáin was living and working on Oileán Ruadh ('Red Island') on Lough Mask in the house of Tadhg Og O Flaherty on 1 April 1651.

The "Lough Mask Murders" of 1882 were a notorious incident in the Land War in which a grandfather and grandson acting as bailiffs were killed by tenant farmers and their bodies dumped in the lake.

Legend
According to local legend, a banshee haunts Bly Island, a small island in the lough. There have also been rumored sightings of a banshee around the shore of the lough as well as other forms of paranormal activity.

Fishing and recreation
The lake is popular for its trout fishing. The World Cup Trout Fly Fishing Championship takes place annually on Lough Mask at Cushlough Bay near Ballinrobe.

Petersburg Outdoor Education Center is situated on the shore of the lough, close to Bly Island. The center uses the lake for numerous water sports including kayaking, canoeing and sailing.

Other
"Loch Measca" was taken as the pen-name of Séan Seoighe (John Joyce) in Eachtra múinteóra an Irish-language memoir published in 1929.

See also
List of loughs in Ireland
River Robe

References

External links 
 A Preliminary Synopsis of the WFD Surveillance Monitoring Fish Stock Survey on Lough Mask, June 2009

Mask
Mask
Gaeltacht places in County Mayo